Bezzecca was a comune (municipality) in Trentino in the Italian region Trentino-Alto Adige/Südtirol. On January 1, 2010 it merged (with Pieve di Ledro, Concei, Molina di Ledro, Tiarno di Sopra and Tiarno di Sotto) in the new municipality of Ledro.  It is located about 35 km southwest of Trento.

History

On July 21, 1866 the village was the theatre of a battle part of the Third Italian War of Independence. It was fought after the Battle of Pieve di Ledro.

References

External links

 Bezzecca page on Ledro official website
Coat of arms of Bezzecca

Frazioni of Ledro
Former municipalities of Trentino